IRIB Amoozesh (شبكه’  آموزش, Shibkâh-e Âmuzesh, in Persian "The Education Channel"), is an Islamic Republic of Iran Broadcasting television channel, broadcast Worldwide.

The channel is one of the newer television channels in Iran and was established on October 15, 2002. It's the seventh official channel of IRIB and sometimes referred as Channel 7.

During Pandemic 
The Amoozesh TV channel has been used for broadcasting educational programs amid Corona threat.

Popular programs
Radio 7
Ghand Pahloo
Moshaereh
Khooneh Injast

References

External links

IRIB Amoozesh Live streaming

Television stations in Iran
Persian-language television stations
Islamic Republic of Iran Broadcasting
Television channels and stations established in 1994
Mass media in Tehran
1994 establishments in Iran